Anthimachus I Theos (known as Antimakha in Indian sources) was believed to have been an illegitimate son of Euthydemus, and one of the Greco-Bactrian kings, generally dated from around 185 BC to 170 BC.

Rule
William Woodthorpe Tarn and numismatist Robert Senior place Antimachus as a member of the Euthydemid dynasty and probably as a son of Euthydemus and brother of Demetrius. Other historians, like A.K. Narain, mark him as independent of Euthydemid authority, and probably a scion of some relation to the Diodotid dynasty. He was king of an area covering parts of Bactria and probably also Arachosia in southern Afghanistan (see "Coins of Antimachus I," below). Antimachus I was either defeated during his resistance to the usurper Eucratides, or his main territory was absorbed by the latter upon his death.

Apparently adding to the argument against direct Euthydemid familial connections is a unique tax-receipt that states:

That Antimachus would list his own associate kings argues strongly against the suggestion that he was appointed as a Northern associate ruler of Euthydemus and Demetrius, an idea that anyway is more or less unprecedented among Hellenistic kings. Eumenes and Antimachus could be his heirs; it was standard for Ptolemaic and Seleucid kings to include their sons as joint regents, with variable formal or actual power. While Eumenes never issued any coins, a king named Antimachus II Nikephoros later appeared in India. It seems plausible that the Indian Antimachus was the son of Antimachus I, but it is unclear whether his reign in India overlapped with his father's reign in Bactria.

Coins of Antimachus I

Antimachus I issued numerous silver coins on the Attic standard, with his own image in a flat Macedonian kausia hat, and on the reverse Poseidon with his trident. Poseidon was the god of the ocean and great rivers - some scholars have here seen a reference to the provinces around the Indus River, where Antimachus I may have been a governor - but also the protector of horses, which was perhaps a more important function in the hinterland of Bactria.

On his coinage, Antimachus called himself Theos, "The God", a first in the Hellenistic world. Just like his colleague Agathocles, he issued commemorative coinage, in his case silver tetradrachms honouring Euthydemus I, also called "The God", and Diodotus I, called "The Saviour". This indicates that Antimachus I might have been instrumental in creating a royal state cult.

Antimachus I also issued round bronzes depicting an elephant on the obverse, with a reverse showing the Greek goddess of victory Nike holding out a wreath. The elephant could be a Buddhist symbol. These coins are reminiscent of those of Demetrius I, as well as Apollodotus I.

Other bronzes, square and rather crude, also portray a walking elephant, but with a reverse of a thunderbolt. These have been attributed by Bopearachchi (as well as older scholars) to Arachosia. They are Indian in their design, but the legend is only in Greek.

Notes

References
The Greek in Bactria and India, W. W. Tarn, Cambridge University Press
The Decline of the Indo-Greeks, R. C. Senior and D. MacDonald, Hellenistic Numismatic Society
The Indo-Greeks, A. K. Narain, B.R. Publications

External links

Coins of Antimachus
More coins of Antimachus

Greco-Bactrian kings
2nd-century BC rulers in Asia
Year of death unknown
Year of birth unknown
Euthydemid dynasty
Greek Buddhist monarchs